The dama gazelle (Nanger dama), also known as the addra gazelle or mhorr gazelle, is a species of gazelle. It lives in Africa, in the Sahara desert and the Sahel. A critically endangered species, it has disappeared from most of its former range due to overhunting and habitat loss, and natural populations only remain in Chad, Mali, and Niger. Its habitat includes grassland, shrubland, semi-deserts, open savanna and mountain plateaus. Its diet includes grasses, leaves (especially Acacia leaves), shoots, and fruit.

In Niger, the dama gazelle has become a national symbol.

Description

The dama gazelle is white with a reddish-brown head and neck. Both sexes usually have medium-length ringed horns curved like an "S". The head is small with a narrow muzzle, and the eyes are relatively large. It has a longer neck and longer legs than most gazelles. A few days following birth, dama young are strong enough to follow the herd, and after a week, they are able to run as fast as the adults. The dama gazelle is considered the largest species of gazelle, with incredibly long legs, which provide extra surface area to dissipate heat, one of the many ways it stays cool in its hot desert environment. It also tends to need more water than some of its desert relatives, but it can withstand fairly long periods of drought. Unlike many other desert mammals, the dama gazelle is a diurnal species, meaning it is active during the day. Always on the alert, the dama gazelle uses a behavior called pronking to warn herd members of danger. Pronking involves the animal hopping up and down with all four of its legs stiff, so that its limbs all leave and touch the ground at the same time. Males also establish territories, and during breeding season, they actively exclude other mature males. They mark their territories with urine and dung piles and secretions from glands near their eyes.

Subspecies status and conservation
The dama gazelle is generally divided into three subspecies based on the colour of the animal's back, flanks and haunches. These three subspecies occupied three blocks running along the east–west axis of the gazelle's range. The easternmost is the N. dama ruficollis (common name addra gazelle) whose historical range was to the east of 15°E. The westernmost is the N. dama mhorr (common name mohor or mhorr gazelle) whose historical range was to the west of 7°E. Between the two was the historical range of the N. dama dama. Genetic studies have raised questions over the validity of these subspecies and the variation in colour (phenotype) appears to be clinal.

 N. d. mhorr, the mhorr gazelle, is extinct in the wild (last known wild sighting was in 1968), but present in captive breeding programs in Europe, North America, North Africa and the Middle East, and several efforts have reintroduced animals into former and similar habitat areas.
 N. d. dama (nominate subspecies) is only kept in captivity at Al Ain Zoo in the United Arab Emirates, and is very rare in the wild.
 N. d. ruficollis, the addra gazelle, is present in captive breeding programs in Europe, North America and the Middle East, and very rare in the wild.

The numbers of this species in the wild have fallen by 80% over the last decade. The IUCN now lists it as critically endangered with a wild population of less than 500 (the most recent review suggests c. 300). It occurs in poor countries and little action is taken to protect the species. The national parks are not well guarded, and poaching still occurs. It has been extirpated from Libya, Mauritania, Morocco and Nigeria. Populations remain in Chad, Mali and Niger, and it has been reintroduced in Senegal and Tunisia.

Threats to survival

Biological threats
The Dama gazelle does not need a lot of water, but it needs more than other desert animals. It is not as resistant and perishes from a lack of water during the drought season. The environment has become ill-suited for it. Habitat pressure from pastoral activity is another reason for decline, as are introduced diseases from livestock.

Human threats
Another reason for the decline of the dama gazelle is habitat destruction. Humans cut down the branches of the trees on which this gazelle feeds. As a result, the trees die and the gazelle cannot eat. Human threats are the most dangerous of threats to the dama gazelle. The main reason this species of gazelle is endangered is because of mechanized hunting; hunters using vehicles increase its decline. Civil unrest, for instance in Sudan, also negatively affects the life of the dama gazelle. Since the gazelle is already having a hard time surviving, these conditions have made its habitat unsuitable. A potential threat the dama gazelle faces is tourism. Tourists want to take pictures of this endangered species, and in doing so, may be perceived as a threat, especially during the hot season. Gazelles will run away from perceived danger, and in the hot season may overheat and die of stress.

Conservation efforts

Relatively few actions have been taken in the conservation of the dama gazelle. The few measures that have been taken are reserves so the animal can live in a peaceful environment and captive breeding to help rebuild the populations.

A reserve for mhorr gazelles was set up in 1971 to help avoid extinction. This reserve, Parque de Rescate de la Fauna Sahariana (Rescue Park for Saharan Fauna) of the Estación Experimental de Zonas Áridas (Experimental Station of Arid Zones), is in Spain. The reserve has been a success and is still around today.

Another reserve for the mhorr subspecies was set up in Chad, the Ouadi Rime-Ouadi Achime Faunal Reserve. This reserve was effective from 1978–1987, but due to civil war, it was abandoned.

Captive breeding is a very popular way to help an endangered species repopulate. The species reproduces in captivity, but the small founder population potentially presents a problem and may result in inbreeding. The primary focus of European EAZA zoos is the mhorr gazelle (N. d. mhorr), while the primary focus of North American AZA zoos is the addra gazelle (N. d. ruficollis). Mhorr gazelles are also kept in North African facilities and both subspecies are kept in the Middle East. These are maintained as part of the European Endangered Species Programme and Species Survival Plan. The studbooks include 293 mhorr (2014) and 168 addra gazelles (2012). One participant in the addra gazelle plan, White Oak Conservation in Yulee, Florida, has bred the gazelles since 1983, resulting in nearly 300 births. Several hundred additional animals that are not managed as part of the studbooks are kept privately, especially in Texas.

Small population size and inbreeding are a serious concern in this population due to the increased parasite load and reduced reproductive viability. Few substantial in situ conservation efforts have been mounted due to the political situation in their currently fragmented habitat. The survival of this species in the wild depends on more reserves being created in the Sahelian and Saharan zones and better protection in the reserves that do exist. As the population deteriorates, researchers in 2008 stressed the need for healthy captive population and for help to preserve their habitats in the wild.

In 2015, a reintroduction project was conducted in the Western Saharan territory of Morocco, in the Safia Natural Reserve close to the border with Mauritania. 24 gazelles were released in a semi-enclosed facility, seven of which were monitored with telemetry collars. During the course of the project, animals experienced a poaching event, resulting in the deaths of three animals. Additionally, seven animals were killed by domestic dogs from nearby military outposts, suggesting that the animals do not recognize potential predators. This milestone project proved that reintroduction of wild animals in this part of the world is extremely difficult despite the favorable sentiment of the majority of local communities.

References

External links

The Living Desert - Mhorr gazelle
Dama Gazelle at Al Wabra Wildlife Preserve
Animal Bytes

dama gazelle
Mammals of West Africa
Mammals of Chad
Fauna of the Sahara
dama gazelle
Taxa named by Peter Simon Pallas